Sagapenum (Greek σᾰγάπηνον, σικβινίτζα (Du Cange), σεραπίων; Arabic sakbīnadj; Latin sagapenum, sagapium, seraphinum (Pharm. Witenbergica)) is a historical plant from Media, identified with Ferula persica and Ferula szowitziana, also denoting its yellow translucent resin, which causes irritation of the skin and whose smell resembles that of asafoetida.

History 
Pliny (Historia Naturalis 12.126, 19.167, 20.197) holds that sagapenum is similar to ammoniacum, and mentions its use in adultering laser.

According to Dioscorides (De materia medica 3.85, 95), sagapenum smells like silphium and galbanum, and has expectorant, topical, anti-convulsant, and abortifacient properties.

References 

Resins
Traditional medicine
Ferula